Duliophyle is a monotypic moth genus in the family Geometridae described by Warren in 1894. Its only species, Duliophyle agitata, described by Arthur Gardiner Butler in 1878, is found in Japan.

Subspecies
Duliophyle agitata ssp. angustaria Leech, 1897

References

Boarmiini